is the main antagonist of the 2011 anime series Puella Magi Madoka Magica and its 2013 sequel The Rebellion Story. They are a "messenger of magic" that can grant any wish to a certain girl, on the condition that she become a magical girl and fight against witches. It is later revealed that their true identity is Incubator. Kyubey is considered  the main villain of the Puella Magi Madoka Magica series, as they tricked Madoka Kaname and the other protagonists in order to turn them into magical girls and, later on, into witches. Kyubey's true goal is countering entropy and staving off the heat death of the universe.

Creation and design
Kyubey was created and designed by writer Gen Urobuchi. As one of the primary villains in the series, producer Atsuhiro Iwakami stated that "the mash-up of cuteness and darkness is the central theme to Madoka, and Kyubey is an epitome of that theme." A central goal in Urobuchi's writing was to highlight the moral and ethical dissonance between Kyubey and the young middle-school girls, which was done through actions in the series such as Kyubey eating its own corpse in order to recycle energy. Urobuchi compared Kyubey to monsters occurring in the works of horror fiction author H. P. Lovecraft, commenting of the character: "He is not evil, it is his lack of feelings that make him scary."

Appearances

In Madoka Magica
Kyubey is a sexless (though it apparently identifies as a male) extraterrestrial cat-like being posing as a familiar who can grant any wish to a certain girl, on the condition that she become a magical girl and fight against witches. When the chosen girl makes a contract with him, he extracts her soul and places it inside a soul gem, reconstructing their body into a shell that is more resilient in order to fight witches. He constantly tries to get Madoka Kaname to make a contract with him, as she allegedly possesses great magical potential within her that would allow her to become the most powerful magical girl. He can only be seen or heard by magical girls and those with "magical" potential, and is able to communicate with them telepathically.

Kyubey is later revealed to be a member of a hive-minded race called the Incubators, who eat their dead and take their predecessor's place and identity. The Incubators developed the technology to convert emotions into energy, which they use to counter entropy and prevent the impending heat death of the universe. Having evaluated countless races throughout the universe, the Incubators find ideal subjects among humans, specifically pubescent and prepubescent girls as they produce the most energy which reaches its zenith when a magical girl's soul gem turns into a grief seed. Kyubey claims his race lacks emotions (or, at least, that those in his race who have emotions are abnormal), with little understanding of mortality or the value of life, considering their actions simply utilitarian in nature despite appearing cruel to others. Despite this, Kyubey is a very skilled manipulator as he leaves out the vital aspects of the contracts and only reveals the truth when asked. According to Kyubey, the very existence of the Magi-Witch system is what allowed the evolution of mankind's civilization, as many of the main events in human history have had magical girls involved. Despite answering all questions posed to him, there is still much about the universe that Kyubey has not spoken of.

In the side-story manga Puella Magi Kazumi Magica, Kyubey also appears as the contractor of all the magical girls in Asanaru City, including the Pleiades Saints. When the Pleiades learnt the truth about magical girls, they took one of Kyubey's corpses and used it to create their own Incubator Jubey, who could absorb darkness from soul gems. Furthermore, they had Umika cast a spell that would make Kyubey invisible to all other girls in the city and rewrite their own memories to believe they contracted with Jubey, in an attempt to stop more witches from being born. This ultimately backfires as Jubey turns out to be a failure.

In The Rebellion Story, which takes place after the series, Kyubey sealed Homura outside the Law of Circles' jurisdiction to force Madoka back into the physical world in an attempt to restore the witch system of the previous timelines since his kind have been harvesting less energy in the new system. But the scheme backfired when Homura ended up stealing Ultimate Madoka's powers for herself, enslaving Incubators to take Madoka's place in taking on the curses of the new world. Kyubey is last seen lying on the ground, disheveled and shivering as he is driven mad by his sudden ability to feel emotions combined with being forced to shoulder the combined grief, suffering, and despair of every magical girl that is, was, or ever will be.

In other media
A large amount of merchandise based on Kyubey has been created, such as a nendoroid figure by the Good Smile Company, QB Sofa and Bath Set, plush doll, and a hugging pillow.

Reception and legacy
Kyubey won the 1st Newtype Anime Awards for Best Mascot Character in 2011. He took third place and fifth place in the following two years, in 2013 and 2014. Kyubey won the 2011 Net Buzzword's Bronze Prize for his popular catchphrase, and also won the 1st Nikkan Anime Grand Prix's "Worst Dark Character" award by the Nikkan Sports newspaper. Emiri Katō won the 6th Seiyu Awards for Best supporting actress in 2012 for her portrayal of Kyubey. In December 2015, Kyubey was included among the "Anime's Most Despicable Villains", a poll conducted by MyNavi Student. He was voted third cutest mascot character.

Andy Hanley from UK Anime Network initially described him as an "odd cat-like figure". Gabriella Ekens of Anime News Network characterized him as "the alien embodiment of utilitarian logic." Jacob Churosh of THEM Anime Reviews described, "Emiri Katou's contribution in the role of Kyuubey is also considerable; although he initially seems rather monotonously cheerful, Katou eventually manages to convey the relentless, strange rationality—what one might call the alien logic—that drives him."

EJ Rivera, marking specialist for the Aniplex of America, stated in 2012 that "Fans love to hate him."

Kyubey was listed by Paste magazine as the eighth-greatest anime villain. Lynzee Loveridge of Anime News Network ranked him at number 3 of "8 Shocking Betrayals" list for deceiving the magical girls. Comic Book Resources ranked Kyubey first in the website's "The 20 Strongest Alien Species In Anime" list, with writer Ashley Glenn stating "this is perhaps one of the most powerful aliens out there". Game Revolution also included Kyubey among their "greatest anime betrayals ever" list.

References

External links
 CHARACTER｜魔法少女まどか☆マギカ

Puella Magi Madoka Magica characters
Anime and manga mascots
Anime and manga supervillains
Anime and manga telepaths
Deal with the Devil
Extraterrestrial characters in television
Fictional cannibals
Fictional cats
Fictional characters with immortality
Fictional con artists
Fictional extraterrestrial life forms
Fictional familiar spirits
Fictional fraudsters
Fictional soul collectors
Fictional tricksters
Fictional witch hunters
Mascots introduced in 2011
Television characters introduced in 2011
Villains in animated television series